This is a list of Malian writers.

 Ahmad Baba al Massufi (1556–1627), writer and scholar.
 Abdoulaye Ascofaré (1949– ), poet and filmmaker.
 Ibrahima Aya (1967– )
 Amadou Hampâté Bâ (1900/1901–1991), historian, theologian, ethnographer, novelist and autobiographer. 
 Adame Ba Konaré (1947– ), historian and writer.
 Seydou Badian Kouyaté (1928–2018), novelist and politician. 
 Siriman Cissoko (1934– ), poet.
 Sidiki Dembele (1921– ), novelist and playwright.
 Massa Makan Diabaté (1938–1988), historian, author and playwright.
 Souéloum Diagho, poet.
 Aïda Mady Diallo, novelist and director.
 Aly Diallo, French-language novelist first published in German translation.
 Alpha Mandé Diarra (1954– )
 Oumou Armand Diarra (1967– ), born in Yugoslavia.
 Doumbi Fakoly (1944– ), non-fiction writer
 Aïcha Fofana (1957–2003), first female Malian novelist
 Mamadou Gologo (c.1924– ), autobiographical novelist and poet.
 Aoua Kéita (1912–1980), independence activist and autobiographer.
 Fatoumata Keïta (1977– ), poet, novelist, essayist.
 Moussa Konaté (1951–2013), French-language writer.
 Ibrahima Mamadou Ouane (1908– ), writer.
 Yambo Ouologuem (1940–2017), novelist.
 Bernadette Sanou Dao (1952– ), author and politician.
 Fily Dabo Sissoko (1900–1964), poet.
 Fanta-Taga Tembely (1946– ), French-language novelist.
 Aminata Traoré (1942– ), author, politician and political activist.
 Falaba Issa Traoré (1930–2003), writer, comedian, playwright and director.

See also
Malian literature
List of African writers by country
List of Malians

References

Malian
Writers